Lawrence Christopher Patrick (aka Ytzhak) Braithwaite (March 17, 1963 – July 14, 2008) was a Canadian novelist, spoken-word artist, dub poet, essayist, digital drummer and short fiction writer.

Born in Montreal, Quebec, he has been called "one of the outstanding Canadian prose writers alive" (Gail Scott) and linked to the "New Narrative" movement, a term coined by Steve Abbott. He was the author of the legendary cult novel Wigger.

Braithwaite's work has been praised by Dodie Bellamy for its "sublime impenetrability". and is fueled by a modernist and Fredric Jameson-influenced late modernist approach to writing and recording. His work is influenced by the musical and social realism of punk rock, opera, musique concrète, noise, hip hop, rap, industrial, black metal, country music and dub.

Braithwaite utilized the intensity of the New York City No Wave scene and the Los Angeles and Montreal hardcore punk music subcultures to compose his narrative. His family has laid him to rest in Notre-Dames-des-Neiges Cemetery, Montreal, Quebec.

Braithwaite was openly gay. He was a vocal critic of the LGBT community's sometimes inadequate response to issues of racism.

Bibliography
Wigger (1995)  	
Ratz Are Nice: PSP (2000) 
Speed, thrash, death: Alamo, B. C. (with illustrations by Krista E. McLean & Max)
More at 7:30 (Notes from New Palestine)

Anthologies
Queeries: An Anthology of Gay Male Prose (ed. Dennis Denisoff, 1994): "Spunk"
Role Call: A Generational Anthology of Social & Political Black Literature & Art
Dodie Bellamy and Kevin Killian's Mirage #4/Period(ical)
Bluesprints: Anthology of Black British Columbian Literature and Orature *Redzone zine, 	
Of the Flesh: Dangerous Fiction 	
"Vanilla Primitive". in the e-journal Sleepy Brain
Nocturnes 3 Review of the Literary Arts 2005 	
Biting the Error: Writers Explore Narrative 	
Sidebrow e-journal. and  
New Standards: The First Decade of Fiction at Fourteen Hills.
The World Crisis Web (ed. Danny Dayus) Revolution is Bloody
Black Ice. 
The Rain Review of Books

Recordings
Logopolis with The Killing Flaw
Good Violence. D.U.N. 	
How fast Does Light travel (for George Scott 3rd, James Chance and Lil G).
Olivet (H.A.T.s in the Square) (featuring Intifada Al Ard).
Unnerstated (Downpressin) from Hurricane Angel "Luckily I Was Half Cat"
En Fins (Clichy Sous Bois) with Tolan McNeil (AKA The Giver).
London bomb sensation (hoffman sub dub the samo samo) lord patch vs david patrick
Unnerstated (a cappella) in Sean Lennon's Upstart Radio in  Mindwalk 31: Driving to Baghdad
En Fins (Clichy Sous Bois) in Mindwalk 42: Henry, Ann Coulter & the FCC.
Just A Sect For Whiteboys In Afrika

See also

 List of black Canadians
 List of skinhead books

References

External links
Publisher's interview with Braithwaite
"The Black Gangster as Urban Resistance: A Review of Sam Greenlee, The Spook Who Sat By the Door" by Braithwaite
" to Lawrence Braithwaite" by Fantastic Weapon (15 August 2008)

1963 births
2008 deaths
Canadian male novelists
Canadian male short story writers
Black Canadian writers
Canadian spoken word poets
20th-century Canadian novelists
20th-century Canadian poets
20th-century Canadian male writers
Canadian male poets
21st-century Canadian poets
Canadian LGBT novelists
Canadian LGBT poets
Canadian gay writers
Jewish Canadian writers
Writers from Montreal
20th-century Canadian short story writers
21st-century Canadian short story writers
Dub poets
21st-century Canadian male writers
Black Canadian LGBT people
20th-century Canadian LGBT people
Gay poets
Gay novelists